Winona is an unincorporated community in southeastern Butler Township, Columbiana County, Ohio, United States.  It has a post office with the ZIP code 44493.

History
A post office called Winona has been in operation since 1868. The community was named after the character Wenonah in the 1855 epic poem The Song of Hiawatha by Henry Wadsworth Longfellow.

References

Unincorporated communities in Columbiana County, Ohio
1868 establishments in Ohio
Unincorporated communities in Ohio